Complex organizations may refer to:
 organizations that have many people, processes, rules, strategies, and basic units
 organizations as studied by the emerging field of Complexity theory and organizations
 the object of study in Charles Perrow's book Complex Organizations

See also
Strategic complexity (disambiguation)